Albert Thompson (born 1912, date of death unknown) was a Welsh footballer.

Career
Thompson was born in Llanbradach, Wales, and joined Bradford Park Avenue from Barry Town in 1934. After making 11 appearances and scoring two goals in the league for Bradford, he joined York City in 1936. He was York City's top scorer for the 1936–37 season, with 28 goals. He joined Swansea Town in 1937, after making 29 appearances and scoring 28 goals for York. After making 4 appearances in the league for Swansea, he joined Wellington Town.

Notes

1912 births
Year of death missing
Welsh footballers
Association football forwards
Bradford (Park Avenue) A.F.C. players
York City F.C. players
Swansea City A.F.C. players
Barry Town United F.C. players
Telford United F.C. players
Date of birth missing